was a train station in Tsukigata, Kabato District, Hokkaidō, Japan.

Lines
Hokkaido Railway Company
Sasshō Line

Station layout
The station had an island platform serving two tracks. A level crossing connected the platform and the station building, which was located to the northeast of the platform. There was also a third track.

Adjacent stations

History
The station opened on October 3, 1935.

In December 2018, it was announced that the station would be closed on May 7, 2020, along with the rest of the non-electrified section of the Sasshō Line. The actual last service was on April 17, 2020 amid the COVID-19 outbreak.

References

Stations of Hokkaido Railway Company
Railway stations in Hokkaido Prefecture
Railway stations in Japan opened in 1935
Railway stations closed in 2020